Genoplesium archeri, commonly known as the elfin midge orchid and as Corunastylis archeri in Australia, is a small terrestrial orchid endemic to south-eastern Australia. It has a single thin leaf fused to the flowering stem and up to fifteen small, hairy, yellowish green flowers with purple stripes. It grows in a wide range of habitats in New South Wales, Victoria and Tasmania.

Description
There is an narrow egg-shaped callus in the centre of the labellum and extending nearly to its tip. Flowering occurs from November to March.

Taxonomy and naming
The elfin midge orchid was first formally described in 1858 by Joseph Dalton Hooker who gave it the name Prasophyllum archeri from a specimen collected by William Archer near Cheshunt. The description was published in The botany of the Antarctic voyage of H.M. discovery ships Erebus and Terror. III. Flora Tasmaniae. In 1989, David Jones and Mark Clements changed the name to Genoplesium archeri and in 2002 changed the name again to Corunastylis archeri. The specific epithet (archeri) honours the collector of the type specimen.

Distribution and habitat
Genoplesium archeri grows in a wide range of habitats including swamp margins and open forest.

References

External links
 
 

archeri
Endemic orchids of Australia
Orchids of New South Wales
Orchids of Victoria (Australia)
Orchids of Tasmania
Plants described in 1927